Rafael Edgardo Montalvo Torres (born March 31, 1964, Río Piedras, Puerto Rico) is a former Major League Baseball pitcher whose time in the big leagues consisted of only 1 inning in 1 game at the age of 22. He holds the record with several other pitchers for having the shortest career. His one appearance came on Sunday, April 13, as a member of the Houston Astros. He pitched one inning against the Atlanta Braves and allowed one run, one hit, and two walks. Shortly thereafter he was demoted to the Tucson Toros in the minor leagues. After the Astros reached the 1986 NLCS he was awarded $500 as his share of the winnings.

The game
Montalvo was brought into the game to pitch the top of the 8th inning in front of 8,739 fans at the Astrodome. With Montalvo on the mound, Glenn Hubbard grounded out to the pitcher; Ozzie Virgil flied out to left; Omar Moreno tripled; and Rafael Ramirez grounded out to the pitcher. In the 9th inning Dale Murphy walked and Bob Horner walked. Frank DiPino then replaced Montalvo. The game ended with an Atlanta Braves 8–5 victory. Houston Chronicle beat writer Neil Hohlfield claimed that Montalvo made nice "goalie like" plays on balls hit at him by Hubbard and Ramirez, but did not have much control of his pitches.

Present
In 2007 Montalvo served as the pitching coach for the minor league Hudson Valley Renegades in the Tampa Bay Devil Rays system. He now resides in Texas with his wife.

References

External links
 Retrosheet

1964 births
Living people
Alacranes de Campeche players
Albuquerque Dukes players
Atlantic City Surf players
Edmonton Trappers players
Houston Astros players
Industriales de Monterrey players
Lethbridge Dodgers players
Lodi Dodgers players
Major League Baseball pitchers
Major League Baseball players from Puerto Rico
Mexican League baseball pitchers
Midland Angels players
People from Río Piedras, Puerto Rico
Puerto Rican expatriate baseball players in Canada
Puerto Rican expatriate baseball players in Mexico
Rieleros de Aguascalientes players
San Antonio Dodgers players
Sportspeople from San Juan, Puerto Rico
Tigres del México players
Tucson Toros players
Vero Beach Dodgers players
Puerto Rican expatriate baseball players in Italy
Fortitudo Baseball Bologna players
China Times Eagles players
Mercuries Tigers players
Piratas de Campeche players
Wei Chuan Dragons players
Puerto Rican expatriate baseball players in Taiwan